Turovo is a rural locality (a village) in Golovinskoye Rural Settlement, Sudogodsky District, Vladimir Oblast, Russia. The population was 7 as of 2010.

Geography 
Turovo is located 11 km south-east from Golovino, 25 km southwest of Sudogda (the district's administrative centre) by road. Burlygino is the nearest rural locality.

References 

Rural localities in Sudogodsky District